Malcolm Hill (born 7 October 1938) is a former Australian rules footballer who played for Hawthorn in the VFL during the 1960s.

Hill was a ruckman and started his career with Hawthorn in 1960. He played three seasons of VFL football and was a premiership player in 1961. After leaving Hawthorn he moved to South Australia and went on to play for Sturt during the rest of the 1960s. He played only intermittently, appearing in a total of 40 games for Sturt over the seven years. Hill was a premiership player in 1966, 1968 and 1969.

External links

1938 births
Australian rules footballers from Victoria (Australia)
Hawthorn Football Club players
Hawthorn Football Club Premiership players
Sturt Football Club players
Old Scotch Football Club players
Living people
One-time VFL/AFL Premiership players